The South Huon Gulf languages are a linkage of the Huon Gulf languages of Papua New Guinea.

Components

Iwal (Kaiwa)
Hote, Yamap
Buang linkage: Mapos Buang, Mangga Buang, Piu, Kapin, Vehes, Mumeng (Dambi–Kumalu, Gorakor–Patep–Zenag)

The varieties of the Mumeng dialect chain are partially mutually intelligible.

References 

 
Huon Gulf languages
Languages of Morobe Province